Górki Duże may refer to the following places in Poland:
Górki Duże, Łódź Voivodeship (central Poland)
Górki Duże, Masovian Voivodeship (east-central Poland)